Mount Pinchot main refer to:

Mount Pinchot (California), a mountain in the Sierra Nevada
Mount Pinchot (Montana), a mountain in Glacier National Park, Montana
Mount Pinchot (Oklahoma), a mountain in the Wichita Mountains, Oklahoma

See also 
 Pinchot (disambiguation)